The Kramers–Kronig relations are bidirectional mathematical relations, connecting the real and imaginary parts of any complex function that is analytic in the upper half-plane. The relations are often used to compute the real part from the imaginary part (or vice versa) of response functions in physical systems, because for stable systems, causality implies the condition of analyticity, and conversely, analyticity implies causality of the corresponding stable physical system.  The relation is named in honor of Ralph Kronig and Hans Kramers. In mathematics, these relations are known by the names Sokhotski–Plemelj theorem and Hilbert transform.

Formulation

Slightly weaker conditions are also possible. The Kramers–Kronig relations are given by

and

where  denotes the Cauchy principal value. So the real and imaginary parts of such a function are not independent, and the full function can be reconstructed given just one of its parts.

Derivation

The proof begins with an application of Cauchy's residue theorem for complex integration. Given any analytic function  in the closed upper half-plane, the function , where  is real, will also be analytic in the upper half-plane. The residue theorem consequently states that

for any closed contour within this region. We then decompose the integral into its contributions along each of these three contour segments and pass them to limits. We are left with the segments along the real axis and the half-circle around the pole. We pass the size of the half-circle to zero and obtain

The second term in the last expression is obtained using the theory of residues, more specifically, the Sokhotski–Plemelj theorem. Rearranging, we arrive at the compact form of the Kramers–Kronig relations:

The single  in the denominator effectuates the connection between the real and imaginary components. Finally, split  and the equation into their real and imaginary parts to obtain the forms quoted above.

Physical interpretation and alternate form

We can apply the Kramers–Kronig formalism to response functions. In certain linear physical systems, or in engineering fields such as signal processing, the response function  describes how some time-dependent property  of a physical system responds to an impulse force  at time   For example,  could be the angle of a pendulum and  the applied force of a motor driving the pendulum motion. The response  must be zero for  since a system cannot respond to a force before it is applied.
Additionally, if we subject the system to an oscillatory force with a frequency much higher than its highest resonant frequency, there will be almost no time for the system to respond before the forcing has switched direction, and so the frequency response  will converge to zero as  becomes very large.  From these physical considerations, we see that  will typically satisfy the conditions needed for the Kramers–Kronig relations to apply.

The imaginary part of a response function describes how a system dissipates energy, since it is in phase with the driving force.  The Kramers–Kronig relations imply that observing the dissipative response of a system is sufficient to determine its out of phase (reactive) response, and vice versa.

Fortunately, in most physical systems, the positive frequency-response determines the negative-frequency response because  is the Fourier transform of a real-valued response . We will make this assumption henceforth.

As a consequence, .

Consider the first relation, which gives the real part .

Since  is odd, the second integral vanishes, and we are left with

The same derivation for the imaginary part gives

These are the Kramers–Kronig relations in a form that is useful for physically realistic response functions.

Related proof from the time domain

Hu and Hall and Heck give a related and possibly more intuitive proof that avoids contour integration. It is based on the facts that:

 A causal impulse response can be expressed as the sum of an even function and an odd function, where the odd function is the even function multiplied by the sign function.
 The even and odd parts of a time domain waveform correspond to the real and imaginary parts of its Fourier integral, respectively.
 Multiplication by the sign function in the time domain corresponds to the Hilbert transform (i.e. convolution by the Hilbert kernel ) in the frequency domain.

Combining the formulas provided by these facts yields the Kramers–Kronig relations. This proof covers slightly different ground from the previous one in that it relates the real and imaginary parts in the frequency domain of any function that is causal in the time domain, offering an approach somewhat different from the condition of analyticity in the upper half plane of the frequency domain.

An article with an informal, pictorial version of this proof is also available.

Magnitude (gain)–phase relation

The conventional form of Kramers–Kronig above relates the real and imaginary part of a complex response function. A related goal is to find a relation between the magnitude and phase of a complex response function.

In general, unfortunately, the phase cannot be uniquely predicted from the magnitude. A simple example of this is a pure time delay of time T, which has amplitude 1 at any frequency regardless of T, but has a phase dependent on T (specifically, phase = 2π × T × frequency).

There is, however, a unique amplitude-vs-phase relation in the special case of a minimum phase system, sometimes called the Bode gain–phase relation. The terms Bayard–Bode relations and Bayard–Bode theorem, after the works of Marcel Bayard (1936) and Hendrik Wade Bode (1945) are also used for either the Kramers–Kronig relations in general or the amplitude–phase relation in particular, particularly in the fields of telecommunication and control theory.

Applications in physics

Complex refractive index
The Kramers–Kronig relations are used to relate the real and imaginary portions for the complex refractive index  of a medium, where  is the extinction coefficient. Hence, in effect, this also applies for the complex relative permittivity and electric susceptibility.

Optical activity
The Kramers–Kronig relations establish a connection between optical rotary dispersion and circular dichroism.

Magneto-optics
Kramers–Kronig relations enable exact solutions of nontrivial scattering problems, which find applications in magneto-optics.

Electron spectroscopy
In electron energy loss spectroscopy, Kramers–Kronig analysis allows one to calculate the energy dependence of both real and imaginary parts of a specimen's light optical permittivity, together with other optical properties such as the absorption coefficient and reflectivity.

In short, by measuring the number of high energy (e.g. 200 keV) electrons which lose a given amount of energy in traversing a very thin specimen (single scattering approximation), one can calculate the imaginary part of permittivity at that energy. Using this data with Kramers–Kronig analysis, one can calculate the real part of permittivity (as a function of energy) as well.

This measurement is made with electrons, rather than with light, and can be done with very high spatial resolution. One might thereby, for example, look for ultraviolet (UV) absorption bands in a laboratory specimen of interstellar dust less than a 100 nm across, i.e. too small for UV spectroscopy. Although electron spectroscopy has poorer energy resolution than light spectroscopy, data on properties in visible, ultraviolet and soft x-ray spectral ranges may be recorded in the same experiment.

In angle resolved photoemission spectroscopy the Kramers–Kronig relations can be used to link the real and imaginary parts of the electrons self-energy. This is characteristic of the many body interaction the electron experiences in the material. Notable examples are in the high temperature superconductors, where kinks corresponding to the real part of the self-energy are observed in the band dispersion and changes in the MDC width are also observed corresponding to the imaginary part of the self-energy.

Hadronic scattering
The Kramers–Kronig relations are also used under the name "integral dispersion relations" with reference to hadronic scattering. In this case, the function is the scattering amplitude. Through the use of the optical theorem the imaginary part of the scattering amplitude is then related to the total cross section, which is a physically measurable quantity.

Electron scattering
Similarly to Hadronic scattering, the Kramers–Kronig relations are employed in high energy electron scattering. In particular, they enter the derivation of the Gerasimov–Drell–Hearn sum rule.

Geophysics
For seismic wave propagation, the Kramer–Kronig relation helps to find right form for the quality factor in an attenuating media.

See also
 Dispersion (optics)
 Linear response function
 Numerical analytic continuation

References

Citations

Sources

 
 
 
 

Complex analysis
Electric and magnetic fields in matter